Karadolo is a settlement in Kenya's Siaya County.

References 

Populated places in Western Province (Kenya)
Siaya County